Siege of Ruthven Barracks may refer to:

 Siege of Ruthven Barracks (1745)
 Siege of Ruthven Barracks (1746)